Wayne William Turley  (born 2 November 1972) is an Australian international lawn and indoor bowler.

Bowls career
In 2006 he won a gold medal in the men's triples at the 2006 Commonwealth Games. He won a silver medal four years later at the 2010 Commonwealth Games in Delhi.  

In between he won a silver medal at the 2008 World Outdoor Bowls Championship. He married fellow Australian bowls international Claire Duke in 2013.

He won three gold medals and one silver medal at the Asia Pacific Bowls Championships.

Despite being Australian he won the 2005 fours title at the New Zealand National Bowls Championships when bowling for the Taren Point Bowls Club.

References

Australian male bowls players
Living people
1972 births
Recipients of the Medal of the Order of Australia
Commonwealth Games medallists in lawn bowls
Commonwealth Games gold medallists for Australia
Commonwealth Games silver medallists for Australia
Bowls players at the 2006 Commonwealth Games
Bowls players at the 2010 Commonwealth Games
Medallists at the 2006 Commonwealth Games
Medallists at the 2010 Commonwealth Games